Frank Edward Van Lare (February 22, 1900 – December 23, 1971) was an American businessman and politician from New York.

Life

He was born on February 22, 1900, in an area of the Town of Gates which later was annexed by the City of Rochester, in Monroe County, New York. He was the son of Isaac Van Lare (1857–1928) and Jozina (Butler) Van Lare (1862–1933). He attended the public schools. Then he engaged in the fuel business. He married Dorothy R. Harward (1900–1965), and their son was Donald F. Van Lare (1936–2013). He entered politics as a Republican.

Van Lare was a member of the New York State Senate from 1951 to 1966, sitting in the 168th, 169th, 170th, 171st, 172nd, 173rd, 174th, 175th and 176th New York State Legislatures.

He died on December 23, 1971, in Rochester, New York; and was buried at the White Haven Memorial Park in Pittsford.

Sources

External links
 

1900 births
1971 deaths
Politicians from Rochester, New York
Republican Party New York (state) state senators
20th-century American politicians
Businesspeople from Rochester, New York
20th-century American businesspeople